Wilberforce Eames (October 12, 1855 – December 6, 1937) was an American bibliographer and librarian, known as the 'Dean of American bibliographers'.

Early life 
Eames was born in Newark, New Jersey to Nelson and Harriet Phoebe Eames (née Crame). He spent most of his early life in Brooklyn, his family moving there in 1861 upon the death of their other son. His formal schooling ended before Eames entered high school.

He worked for the East New York Sentinel from 1870, the experience leading him to set up a small scale press in his home. Subsequently Eames worked as a postal clerk in Brooklyn, until he was hired by bookseller Edward R. Gillespie, who employed Eames from 1873 to 1879. He was subsequently employed by N. Tibbals & Sons, Henry Miller and Charles L. Woodward until 1885. After that, he worked as a personal assistant for George Henry Moore, head of Lenox Library.

Library work 
After Moore's death in 1892, Eames became an assistant librarian, and eventually a full librarian at Lenox, and later, upon the merging of the Tilden trust, Astor and Lenox libraries he was appointed 'Lenox Librarian.' He became Chief of the American History Division at the New York Public Library in 1911, and Bibliographer (a position he held until his death) there in 1916. In 1924, The New York Times called Eames: "The greatest living scholar of books in America." A. S. W. Rosenbach said of Eames: "Probably the greatest student of books in the whole history of scholarship and book collecting lives quietly in New York, worshiped by every collector and scholar and unknown to the world in general- Wilberforce Eames."

Eames contributed to many bibliographies, including Joseph Sabin's Dictionary of Books relating to America. He also amassed a private book collection, counting 20,000 books in 1904, many of which were later bequeathed to and incorporated into the NYPL.

A self-taught scholar, Eames was elected a member of the American Antiquarian Society in 1893. Harvard University awarded him an honorary degree in 1896, as did the University of Michigan and Brown University (both in 1924). In 1929, he received the gold medal of the Bibliographical Society of London, and honors of the New York Historical Society in 1931. He was awarded Honorary Membership in the American Library Association in 1933.

References

External links 

 Biography
 
Wilberforce Eames Collection: Nineteenth-century religious tracts in various languages (i.e., Tamal and Bulgarian), (103 items). From the Rare Book and Special Collections Division at the Library of Congress

1855 births
1937 deaths
American bibliographers
American librarians
Members of the American Antiquarian Society
Writers from Newark, New Jersey